Half Baked is a 1998 American stoner comedy film starring Dave Chappelle, Jim Breuer, Harland Williams, and Guillermo Díaz. The film was directed by Tamra Davis, co-written by Chappelle and Neal Brennan and produced by Robert Simonds. The film received negative reviews but has since become a cult film.

Plot
Four lifelong stoners and friends (Thurgood, Scarface, Brian, and Kenny) live together in New York City. Thurgood, a janitor at a medical lab, orders some 
weed from Samson, the famous local dealer, and the four smoke it. When Kenny, a gentle kindergarten teacher, is out on a munchie run, he is arrested for accidentally killing a diabetic police horse by feeding it junk food. His friends are forced to raise $1 million to bail him out before the other prisoners take advantage of his gentle nature. While visiting Kenny in prison, Thurgood meets Mary Jane and pursues a romantic relationship, which is strained by his having to conceal his marijuana smoking from her, as she is adamantly anti-drug.

Thurgood gets asked one day by a scientist at the lab to get a pound of cannabis from storage and Thurgood freaks out when he realizes what the scientist had him get. The grateful scientist thanks Thurgood for the good deed by giving him some free weed. Thurgood brings it home and the three friends get high. Scarface gets the idea to have Thurgood steal medical marijuana from his work so that the three of them can sell it to raise money to free Kenny.

When the success of the friends' marijuana business grows enough to raise the ire of local drug lord Samson Simpson, Samson extorts them for $20,000 a week, while Mary Jane dumps Thurgood when she finds out he is dealing drugs. The friends plan a robbery of the medical laboratory to increase their earnings enough to both fend off Samson and free Kenny, but are arrested when they try to execute the plan.

Thurgood strikes a deal with the police to wear a wire to a meeting with Samson in exchange for freeing Kenny and dropping the charges against him and his friends. They meet with Samson, but their plan is exposed when the police detectives fail to arrive as backup since they are high. However, Thurgood and his friends are able to take out Samson's henchwomen, and Samson is taken out by the ghost of Jerry Garcia. The police detectives arrive soon after to arrest Samson and his henchwomen, while Thurgood and friends are released from police custody. Thurgood meets with Mary Jane to tell her he is giving up marijuana and wants to get back together. The film ends with their reuniting.

Cast

 Dave Chappelle as Thurgood Jenkins/Sir Smoka Lot
 Kevin Duhaney as Young Thurgood
 Jim Breuer as Brian
 James Cooper as Young Brian
 Harland Williams as Kenny Davis
 Michael Colton as Young Kenny
 Guillermo Díaz as Scarface
 Matthew Raposo as Young Scarface
 Rachel True as Mary Jane Potman
 Tommy Chong as Squirrel Master
 Clarence Williams III as Samson Simpson
 Laura Silverman as Jan
 R. D. Reid as Scientist
 Gregg Rogell and Kevin Brennan as Potheads

Co-writer Neal Brennan appears as an employee, while cameos include Jon Stewart as the enhancement smoker, Snoop Doggy Dogg as the scavenger smoker, Stephen Baldwin as the MacGyver smoker, Gladys O'Connor as the grandma smoker, Willie Nelson as the historian smoker, and Tracy Morgan as the V. J. Steven Wright makes an uncredited appearance, as do Janeane Garofalo and Bob Saget.

Production
Chappelle and Breuer shared a manager and had previously planned working together on the short-lived sitcom Buddies. In spring 1996, both were working separately on marijuana-related film projects. Chappelle and Brennan's script was complete, so Breuer was asked to join their project.

The movie was filmed in Toronto in the summer of 1997. Dirty Work was filming at the same time, and the cast and crew stayed in the same hotel. Bob Saget, who directed Dirty Work, filmed a short, uncredited cameo for Half Baked.

Chappelle asked Harrison Ford to do a cameo in the film but he declined.

Release

Box office
Half Baked hit theaters in the United States on January 16, 1998, earning $7,722,540 in its opening weekend, ranking at No. 6, and, by the end of its run, grossed $17,460,020.

Critical response
Half Baked received generally negative reviews from critics. On Rotten Tomatoes, it has an approval rating of 28%, based on reviews from 25 critics. The website's consensus reads, "You'd have to be high to dig Half Bakeds half baked production and scattershot sense of humor -- although maybe that was the point of this Dave Chapelle-led joint." On Metacritic, the film received a score of 16 out of 100 from critics, indicating "overwhelming dislike".

Brendan Kelly of Variety wrote: "A couple of hash brownies short of a satisfying cinematic picnic, with far too few comic highs during the bigscreen reefer party."

It has had several re-releases on DVD and is considered a cult classic.

References

External links

 
 
 
 
 
 

1998 films
1990s buddy comedy films
American buddy comedy films
1990s English-language films
Films directed by Tamra Davis
Films produced by Robert Simonds
American films about cannabis
Films set in New York City
Universal Pictures films
1998 in cannabis
Stoner films
1998 comedy films
1990s American films
Dave Chappelle